1905 in sports describes the year's events in world sport.

American football
College championship
 College football national championship – Chicago Maroons

Professional championships
 Ohio League championship – Massillon Tigers
 Western Pennsylvania Championship – Latrobe Athletic Association

Events
 The college football season is blighted by a spate of serious injuries, some fatal, and U S President Theodore Roosevelt calls upon the game's authorities to reform it.
 6 October — Night-time football is played west of the Mississippi for the first time (see 1905 Cooper vs. Fairmount football game)
 December 25 — An experimental game using new rules is played in Wichita, Kansas under the supervision of John H. Outland.  Proposed rules changes include the addition of the forward pass.

Association football
Argentina
 Boca Juniors was founded in Buenos Aires
England
 The Football League – Newcastle United 48 points, Everton 47, Manchester City 46, Aston Villa 42, Sunderland 40, Sheffield United 40
 1905 FA Cup final – Aston Villa 2–0 Newcastle United at Crystal Palace, London.
 14 March — foundation of Chelsea F.C.
 Alf Common becomes the first player ever to be transferred for £1,000 when he moves from Sunderland to Middlesbrough
 The First and Second Divisions are expanded from eighteen to twenty teams each ahead of the 1905–06 season, bringing the total number of League clubs to 40.  New clubs elected to the league include Chelsea, Hull City and Leeds City.
Germany
 National Championship – Union Berlin 2–0 Karlsruher FV at Köln-Merheim 
Scotland
 Scottish Football League – Celtic
 Scottish Cup final – Third Lanark 3–1 Rangers at Hampden Park (replay, following 0–0 draw at Hampden Park)
Turkey
 Galatasaray founded in Istanbul

Athletics
 Frederick Lorz wins the ninth running of the Boston Marathon.

Australian rules football
VFL Premiership
 Fitzroy wins the 9th VFL Premiership: Fitzroy 4.6 (30) d Collingwood 2.5 (17) at Melbourne Cricket Ground (MCG)

Baseball
World Series
 9–14 October — New York Giants (NL) defeats Philadelphia Athletics (AL) by 4 games to 1 in the 1905 World Series, which is the first organized by the modern National and American Leagues.

Boxing
Events
 13 May — James J. Jeffries announces his retirement from boxing and relinquishes the World Heavyweight Championship title
 3 July — Jeffries referees the Marvin Hart v. Jack Root fight at Reno and "awards" his title to Hart, who has won by a 12th-round knockout.  Besides winning this bout, Hart has earlier in the year defeated Jack Johnson over 20 rounds at San Francisco.  Hart holds the title until 1906.
 9 September — Battling Nelson defeats Jimmy Britt by an eighteenth-round knockout to win the World Lightweight Championship.
 20 December — Bob Fitzsimmons loses his World Light Heavyweight Championship to Philadelphia Jack O'Brien on a 13th-round technical knockout in San Francisco.  O'Brien effectively relinquishes the title soon afterwards and it remains vacant until 1914.
Lineal world champions
 World Heavyweight Championship – James J. Jeffries → vacant → Marvin Hart
 World Light Heavyweight Championship – Bob Fitzsimmons → Philadelphia Jack O'Brien → vacant
 World Middleweight Championship – Tommy Ryan
 World Welterweight Championship – Barbados Joe Walcott
 World Lightweight Championship – Jimmy Britt → Battling Nelson
 World Featherweight Championship – Abe Attell
 World Bantamweight Championship – Joe Bowker → vacant → Jimmy Walsh

Cricket
England
 County Championship – Yorkshire
 Minor Counties Championship – Norfolk
 Most runs – C B Fry 2801 @ 70.02 (HS 233)
 Most wickets – Walter Lees 193 @ 18.01 (BB 9–81)
 Wisden Cricketers of the Year – David Denton, Walter Lees, George Thompson, Joe Vine, Levi Wright
Australia
 Sheffield Shield – New South Wales
 Most runs – Warwick Armstrong 460 @ 57.50 (HS 200)
 Most wickets – Frederick Collins 27 @ 23.37 (BB 6–64)
India
 Bombay Presidency – Parsees
South Africa
 Currie Cup – not contested
West Indies
 Inter-Colonial Tournament – not contested

Cycling
Tour de France
 Louis Trousselier (France) wins the 3rd Tour de France

Figure skating
World Figure Skating Championships
 World Men's Champion – Ulrich Salchow (Sweden)

Golf
Major tournaments
 British Open – James Braid
 U.S. Open – Willie Anderson
Other tournaments
 British Amateur – Gordon Barry
 US Amateur – Chandler Egan

Horse racing
England
 Grand National – Kirkland
 1,000 Guineas Stakes – Cherry Lass
 2,000 Guineas Stakes – Vedas
 The Derby – Cicero
 The Oaks – Cherry Lass
 St. Leger Stakes – Challacombe
Australia
 Melbourne Cup – Blue Spec
Canada
 King's Plate – Inferno
Ireland
 Irish Grand National – Red Lad
 Irish Derby Stakes – Flax Park
USA
 Kentucky Derby – Agile
 Preakness Stakes – Cairngorm
 Belmont Stakes – Tanya

Ice hockey
Stanley Cup
 Ottawa Hockey Club wins a challenge series against the Dawson City Nuggets of Dawson City, Yukon two games to nil. The Dawson club has travelled over 4,000 miles by dog sled, boat and train to play the Silver Seven but are outmatched.  Frank McGee, incensed by comments from the Dawson squad, scores 14 goals as Ottawa wins the second game 23–2.
 Ottawa wins the Federal Amateur Hockey League (FAHL) championship to defend the Stanley Cup.
 Ottawa defeats Rat Portage Thistles 2 games to one in a Stanley Cup challenge.
Events
 9 December — Eastern Canada Amateur Hockey Association (ECAHA) is formed from teams in the Canadian Amateur Hockey League (CAHL) and the FAHL.  Stanley Cup champion Ottawa and Montreal Wanderers join from FAHL and Montreal, Montreal Shamrocks, Montreal Victorias and Quebec Bulldogs join from the CAHL.

Lacrosse
Events
 The Intercollegiate Lacrosse Association (ILA) is replaced by the Intercollegiate Lacrosse League, which will be renamed the U.S. Intercollegiate Lacrosse Association (USILA) in 1929.

Motor racing
Gordon Bennett Cup
 Sixth and final running of the Gordon Bennett Cup takes place in France on the Charade Circuit, then known as the Circuit d'Auvergne, at Clermont-Ferrand.  As road racing has been banned in France, this is the first time the trophy is contested on a circuit.  The winner for the second successive year is Léon Théry (France) driving a Richard-Brasier.
Ardennes Circuit
 The fourth Circuit des Ardennes is run on 7 August over 591.255 km (118.251 km x 5 laps) in the vicinity of Bastogne.  The winner is Victor Hémery (France) driving a Darracq 80 hp in a time of 5:58:32.
Vanderbilt Cup
 The second Vanderbilt Cup is run on 14 October over 455.430 km (45.543 km x 10 laps) on Long Island.  The winner is Victor Hémery (France) driving a Darracq 80 hp in a time of 4:36:08.
Shelsley Walsh Speed Hill Climb
 First running of the Shelsley Walsh Speed Hill Climb on August 12, still run annually on the same course.

Rowing
The Boat Race
 1 April — Oxford wins the 62nd Oxford and Cambridge Boat Race

Rugby league
England
 Championship – Oldham
 Challenge Cup final – Warrington 6–0 Hull Kingston Rovers at Headingley Rugby Stadium, Leeds
 Lancashire League Championship – not contested
 Yorkshire League Championship – not contested
 County cup competitions introduced in both Lancashire and Yorkshire ahead of the 1905–06 season.  These are knockout competitions in the same format as the Challenge Cup except for their regional character.

Rugby union
Home Nations Championship
 23rd Home Nations Championship series is won by Wales

Speed skating
Speed Skating World Championships
 Men's All-round Champion
 January 22 - Dutchman Coen de Koning wins the 1,500m, 5,000m & 10,000m at World Allround Speed Skating Championships in Groningen, Netherlands to become 2nd Dutchman to win a world title

Tennis
Events
 Inaugural Australian Championship is held, but for men only
Australia
 Australian Men's Singles Championship – Rodney Heath (Australia) defeats Arthur Curtis (Australia) 4–6 6–3 6–4 6–4
England
 Wimbledon Men's Singles Championship – Laurence Doherty (GB) defeats Norman Brookes (Australia) 8–6 6–2 6–4
 Wimbledon Women's Singles Championship – May Sutton Bundy (USA) defeats Dorothea Douglass Lambert Chambers (GB) 6–3 6–4
France
 French Men's Singles Championship – Maurice Germot (France) defeats André Vacherot (France): details unknown
 French Women's Singles Championship – Kate Gillou (France) defeats Yvonne de Pfeffel (France) 6–0 11–9
USA
 American Men's Singles Championship – Beals Wright (USA) defeats Holcombe Ward (USA) 6–2 6–1 11–9
 American Women's Singles Championship – Elisabeth Moore (USA) defeats Helen Homans (USA) 6–4 5–7 6–1
Davis Cup
 1905 International Lawn Tennis Challenge –  5–0  at Queen's Club (grass) London, United Kingdom

References

 
Sports by year